The C class are a class of diesel locomotives built by English Electric, Rocklea for the Western Australian Government Railways in 1962.

History
The C class was developed from the Queensland Railways 1250 class. The three members of the class entered service in 1962.

They initially hauled passenger services including The Australind, The Kalgoorlie and The Westland before being relegated to hauling suburban passenger services in Perth and shunting at Avon, Forestfield and Geraldton. The last was withdrawn by Westrail in the March 1992 with all three preserved. C1703 is accredited for mainline operation and is periodically used on infrastructure trains.

References

External links
History of Western Australia Railways and Stations gallery

Co-Co locomotives
English Electric locomotives
Diesel locomotives of Western Australia
Railway locomotives introduced in 1962
3 ft 6 in gauge locomotives of Australia
Diesel-electric locomotives of Australia